George W. Childs Elementary School is a K-8 school located in the Point Breeze neighborhood of Philadelphia, Pennsylvania. It is part of the School District of Philadelphia, and the historic building it occupies previously housed the Jeremiah Nichols School and Norris S. Barratt Junior High School.

The current school building was built in stages. The first building was designed by Henry deCourcy Richards in 1908. An expansion was built in 1926–1927 and was designed by Irwin T. Catharine. The Richards building is a three-story, three bay, brick building on a raised basement in the Late Gothic Revival-style. The Catharine building is a four-story, seven bay, brick building on a raised basement in the Art Deco-style.

The building was added to the National Register of Historic Places in 1988. In 2010, the previous Childs school building was closed, and students were moved to the current location. In 2013 Walter G. Smith Elementary School closed, with students redirected to Childs. Therefore, by December of that year the student body numbered 800.

References

External links

Neighbors Invested in Childs Elementary (NICE)

School buildings on the National Register of Historic Places in Philadelphia
Gothic Revival architecture in Pennsylvania
Art Deco architecture in Pennsylvania
School buildings completed in 1908
School District of Philadelphia
South Philadelphia
1908 establishments in Pennsylvania
Public K–8 schools in Philadelphia